The 2018 Tour of Norway was a road cycling stage race that took place in Norway between 16 and 20 May 2018. It was the eighth edition of the Tour of Norway and was rated as a 2.HC event as part of the 2018 UCI Europe Tour.

Teams
20 teams participated in the race, including 3 UCI WorldTeams, 12 UCI Professional Continental teams, and 5 UCI Continental teams. Each team had a maximum of six riders:

Route

Stages

Stage 1

Stage 2

Stage 3

Stage 4

Stage 5

Final general classification

References

External links

2018 UCI Europe Tour
2018 in Norwegian sport
2018